The Centre de services scolaire Marguerite-Bourgeoys is an autonomous school service centre on Montreal Island, Quebec, Canada, appointed by the Ministry of Education.

Its headquarters is in the Saint-Laurent borough of Montreal. Its education centre is in LaSalle, also in Montreal.

History 
The centre is named after Marguerite Bourgeoys (1620–1700), a French nun who helped start education infrastructure in the new colony.

On June 15, 2020, Centre de services scolaire Marguerite-Bourgeoys replaced the former elected Commission scolaire Marguerite-Bourgeoys, which was created on July 1, 1998, as a result of a law passed by the Quebec government that changed the school board system from denominational to linguistic.

Schools

Primary schools

District sud-ouest 
École primaire Beaconsfield (Beaconsfield)
École primaire Catherine-Soumillard (Lachine)
École primaire des Berges-de-Lachine (Lachine)
École primaire du Bout-de-l'Isle (Sainte-Anne-de-Bellevue)
École primaire Émile-Nelligan (Kirkland)
École primaire Gentilly (Dorval)
École primaire Jardin-des-Saints-Anges (Lachine)
 John-F.-Kennedy
École primaire Joseph-Henrico (Baie-D'Urfé)
École primaire Marguerite-Bourgeoys (Pointe-Claire)
École primaire Martin-Bélanger (Lachine)
École primaire Paul-Jarry (Lachine)
École primaire Philippe-Morin (Lachine)
École primaire Pointe-Claire (Pointe-Claire)
École primaire Saint-Louis (Pointe-Claire)
École primaire Saint-Rémi (Beaconsfield)
École primaire Très-Saint-Sacrement (Lachine)
École primaire Victor-Thérien (Lachine)

District nord-ouest 
École primaire de l'Odyssée (Pierrefonds-Roxboro)
École primaire Dollard-Des Ormeaux (Dollard-Des Ormeaux)
École primaire du Bois-de-Liesse (Dollard-Des Ormeaux)
École primaire du Grand-Chêne (Pierrefonds-Roxboro)
École primaire Harfang-des-Neiges (Pierrefonds-Roxboro)
École primaire Jacques-Bizard (L'Île-Bizard–Sainte-Geneviève)
École primaire Jonathan-Wilson (L'Île-Bizard–Sainte-Geneviève)
École primaire Lalande (Pierrefonds-Roxboro)
École primaire Murielle-Dumont (Pierrefonds-Roxboro)
École primaire Perce-Neige (Pierrefonds-Roxboro)
École primaire Sainte-Geneviève (Ouest) (L'Île-Bizard–Sainte-Geneviève)
École primaire Saint-Gérard (Pierrefonds-Roxboro)
École primaire Saint-Luc (Dollard-des-Ormeaux)

District sud-est 
École primaire Chanoine-Joseph-Théorêt (Verdun) 
 des Coquelicots
École primaire des Découvreurs (LaSalle)
École primaire des Saules-Rieurs (Verdun)
École primaire du Grand-Héron (LaSalle)
École primaire du Petit-Collège (LaSalle)
École primaire Henri-Forest (Lasalle)
École primaire Laurendeau-Dunton (LaSalle)
École primaire L'Eau-Vive (LaSsalle)
École primaire Lévis-Sauvé (Verdun)
École primaire Notre-Dame-de-la-Garde (Verdun)
École primaire Notre-Dame-de-la-Paix (Verdun)
École primaire Notre-Dame-de-Lourdes (Verdun)
École primaire Notre-Dame-des-Rapides (Lasalle)
École primaire Notre-Dame-des-Sept-Douleurs (Verdun)
École primaire de l'Orée-du-Boisé (LaSalle)
École primaire Pierre-Rémy (LaSalle)
École primaire Sainte-Catherine-Labouré (LaSalle)
École primaire Sainte-Geneviève (Sud) (LaSalle)École primaire Terre-des-Jeunes (LaSalle)

 District est École primaire Académie Saint-Clément (Mont-Royal)École primaire de la Mosaïque (Côte-Saint-Luc)École primaire des Amis-du-Monde (Côte-Saint-Luc)École primaires des Marguerite (Verdun)École primaire Guy-Drummond (Outremont)École primaire Île-des-Soeurs (Verdun)École primaire Lajoie (Outremont)École primaire Nouvelle-Querbes (Outremont)École primaire Saint-Clément-Est (Mont-Royal)École primaire Saint-Clément-Ouest (Mont-Royal)École primaire Saint-Germain-d'Outremont (Outremont)

 District nord-est École primaire au Trésor-du-BoiséÉcole primaire Beau-Séjour (Saint-Laurent)École primaire Bois-Franc-Aquarelle (Saint-Laurent)École primaire Cardinal-Léger (Saint-Laurent)École primaire des Grands-Êtres (Saint-Laurent)École primaire Édouard-Laurin (Saint-Laurent)École primaire Enfants-du-Monde (Saint-Laurent)École primaire Enfant-Soleil (Saint-Laurent)École primaire HébertÉcole primaire Henri-Beaulieu (Saint-Laurent)École primaire Jean-Grou (Saint-Laurent)École primaire Jonathan (Saint-Laurent)École primaire Katimavik (Saint-Laurent)École primaire Laurentide (Saint-Laurent)

Secondary schools

 Collège Saint-Louis (Lachine)
 École secondaire Dalbé-Viau (Lachine)
 École secondaire des Sources (Dollard-des-Ormeaux)
 École secondaire Dorval-Jean-XXIII (Dorval)
 École secondaire Félix-Leclerc (Pointe-Claire)
 École secondaire Paul-Gérin-Lajoie-d'Outremont (Outremont)

DISTRICT SUD-OUEST
 Collège Saint-Louis
 Dalbé-Viau
 Dorval-Jean-XXIII
 Félix-Leclerc
 John-F.-Kennedy

DISTRICT NORD-OUEST
 des Sources
 Nouvelle école secondaire Pierrefonds
 École secondaire Saint-Georges (Senneville)

DISTRICT SUD-EST
 École secondaire Cavelier-De LaSalle (LaSalle)
 de la Traversée
 École secondaire Monseigneur-Richard (Verdun)

DISTRICT EST
 École secondaire Mont-Royal (Mont-Royal)
 École secondaire Paul-Gérin-Lajoie-d'Outremont (Outremont, Québec)

DISTRICT NORD-EST
 du Sas (secondaire adapté à ta situation)
 École secondaire Pierre-Laporte (Mont-Royal)
 Rose-Virginie-Pelletier
 École secondaire Saint-Laurent (Saint-Laurent)

Specialized schools
 Le secondaire adapté à ta situation (SAS) (Outremont)
 École primaire et secondaire John-F.-Kennedy (Beaconsfield)
 École Rose-Virginie-Pelletier (RVP) (Pierrefonds-Roxboro)
 de la Traversée

Professional development centres
 Centre de formation professionnelle Léonard-De Vinci (Saint-Laurent)
 Centre de formation professionnelle des métiers de la santé (Kirkland)
 Centre intégré de mécanique, de métallurgie et d'électricité (CIMME) (LaSalle)
 Centre de formation professionnelle de Verdun
 Centre de formation professionnelle des métiers de la santé
 Centre de formation professionnelle des carrefours
 Centre de formation professionnelle de Lachine

Adult education centres
 Centre d'éducation des adultes Champlain (Verdun)
 Centre d'éducation des adultes de LaSalle (Lachine and LaSalle)
 Centre d'éducation des adultes Outremont'' (Outremont)
 Centre d'éducation des adultes Jeanne-Sauvé

References

External links 

 Official web site 
 Resource Teacher

School districts in Quebec
Education in Montreal
Saint-Laurent, Quebec